Teglio (Téi in Valtellinese dialect) is a comune (municipality) in the Province of Sondrio in the Italian region Lombardy, located about  northeast of Milan and about  east of Sondrio, on the border with Switzerland.

The main attraction is the Palazzo Besta, one of the main Renaissance residences in Lombardy.

References

Cities and towns in Lombardy